SS Joseph Stanton was a Liberty ship built in the United States during World War II. She was named after Joseph Stanton, an American military officer during the American Revolutionary War, raising to the rank of major general, in the Continental Army, in command of the Rhode Island Militia. He was a delegate to the Rhode Island Constitutional Convention in 1790, which ratified the United States Constitution and enabled Rhode Island, to be the last of the 13 colonies to join the Union. He was elected by the General Assembly to serve as one of the first two US Senators from Rhode Island, and served from 12 June 1790 to 3 March 1793, as a member of the Anti-Administration Party. He was later elected to the United States House of Representatives, where he served from 4 March 1801 to 3 March 1807, as a member of the Jeffersonian Democrat-Republican Party.

Construction
Joseph Stanton was laid down on 2 May 1942, under a Maritime Commission (MARCOM) contract, MCE hull 304, by the Bethlehem-Fairfield Shipyard, Baltimore, Maryland; she was sponsored by Miss Ruth Reece, the niece of J.A. Bouslog, the manager of the Middle Atlantic District for MARCOM, and was launched on 4 July 1942.

History
She was allocated to Agwilines Inc., on 18 July 1942. On 24 October 1947, she was laid up in the National Defense Reserve Fleet, Wilmington, North Carolina. On 27 March 1964, she was sold for scrapping to Northern Metal Co., for $45,045. She was removed from the fleet on 17 April 1964.

References

Bibliography

 
 
 
 

 

Liberty ships
Ships built in Baltimore
1942 ships
Wilmington Reserve Fleet